The Kwijau or Kuijau are an indigenous ethnic group residing in Sabah, eastern Malaysia on the island of Borneo. The kwijau claim descend from the Nunuk Ragang settlers. They reside in the Interior Division within a 12-mile radius to the west and north of Keningau town. Their population was estimated at 7,910 in the year 2000. They are considered a sub-group of the Kadazan-Dusun, as their language is on the Dusunic branch of the Austronesian language family (ISO 639-3 dkr). About 20% of the population embrace the Christian faith in denominations of evangelical Christianity and Roman Catholicism, the remainder are animist practicing the ancient belief system called Momolianism. They are known for performing the Magunatip, an east Malaysian dance very strongly influenced by the Philippine tinikling. Performed by the young men and women, the dance involves jumping steps that manoeuvre the dancer's feet in and out, so as not to get their feet trapped by 2 moving bamboo poles that are held by another pair of dancers, who beat the poles together and over a shorter length of wood or bamboo, creating an interesting rhythm.

References

External links

Kadazan-Dusun people
Indigenous peoples of Southeast Asia
Ethnic groups in Indonesia
Ethnic groups in Sabah